Benjamin Thomsen (born August 25, 1987), also known as Ben Thomsen, is a World Cup alpine ski racer from Canada. Born in Invermere, British Columbia, he primarily competes in the speed events of Downhill and Super G. Thomsen's father Glenn is a former national team coach for Alpine Canada. Thomsen made his World Cup debut in March 2010; his only podium came in February 2012, a second-place finish at the pre-Olympic downhill at Rosa Khutor in Russia.

World Cup results

Season standings

Top ten results
 1 podium – (1 DH)

World Championship results

Olympic results

References

External links

 
 Benjamin Thomsen World Cup standings at the International Ski Federation
 
 
 Benjamin Thomsen at Alpine Canada
 
 
 Ben Thomsen at Head Skis

1987 births
Canadian male alpine skiers
Living people
People from the Regional District of East Kootenay
Alpine skiers at the 2014 Winter Olympics
Alpine skiers at the 2018 Winter Olympics
Olympic alpine skiers of Canada
Sportspeople from British Columbia